Ballet Fantastique is a 501(c)3 nonprofit, chamber ballet company based in Eugene, Oregon, and co-directed by mother-daughter team Donna and Hannah Bontrager. Ballet Fantastique was founded in October 2000 and currently has three components: A professional chamber ballet company, a pre-professional academy in the Russian Vaganova method of training, and a busy outreach wing (bringing dance to a range of audiences both in-school and in-theater). Ballet Fantastique became a resident company at Eugene's Hult Center for the Performing Arts in June 2014.

Chamber Company 

The Ballet Fantastique contemporary chamber company is directed by mother-daughter choreographer-producers Donna Marisa and Hannah Bontrager and composed of 20 professional artists from across the world. The company fields auditions from dancers across the US and internationally. Since 2003, the company has presented all-original contemporary ballet productions each season at the Hult Center for the Performing Arts. Ballet Fantastique also tours, and has performed with Ballet Rogue in Medford, Oregon, at the internationally recognized Oregon Shakespeare Festival in Ashland, Oregon, and at the Lincoln Performance Hall in downtown Portland, Oregon, to name just a few. The company has been called a "bold, cross-disciplinary dance company" by Dante Zuniga-West of the Eugene Weekly (2011). According to Portland Center Stage Reviews, Ballet Fantastique has "made a name for itself in out-of-the-box revisions of classic story ballets."

Ballet Fantastique concerts feature collaborations with live artists and musicians. Projections of local gallery paintings were used as backdrops for the performance Danse en Rouge: Variations in Red at the Hult Center for the Performing Arts, which also included the Trio Voronezh and classical guitarist John Jarvie. In 2009, Ballet Fantastique collaborated with composer Jeremy Schropp and a 25-part orchestra in Visions d'Amour: 10 Ballets in Paris for the world premiere of his ballet inspired by Vincent van Gogh, "Night at the Café Terrace." Other notable collaborations include the Oregon Mozart Players, the Karin Clarke Gallery, the Eugene Symphony, Shelley and Cal James and their Agents of Unity Band for Cinderella: A Rock Opera Ballet, and the LA-based band Incendio.

Academy of Ballet Fantastique 

The Academy of Ballet Fantastique teaches ballet classes for dancers ages 2–24, and also offers a separate Adult Dance Program for teens and adults ages 13+.

In the Professional Training Division, dancers age 9 and up study the Vaganova Method of training in limited class sizes of 12 students or fewer 

The Young Dancer Program at The Academy of Ballet Fantastique is for dancers age 2 and up, and follows a progressive training approach as well, while introducing young children to creative movement, music education, and fundamentals of ballet.

Students participate in professional performances with the company, and may audition for company positions and apprenticeships upon graduation.  Academy of Ballet Fantastique coaches are experienced in the Vaganova method of training as well as in pedagogy and professional performance.

Outreach 
Ballet Fantastique's busy outreach programming includes scholarships for dancers in financial need, free tickets for youth to attend concerts, in-school integrated arts residencies, and school assembly performances.

History 

Ballet Fantastique became an Oregon non-profit in 2003 and earned 501(c)(3) non-profit status in 2006. The organization was established to bring dance training, performance opportunities and performances to the Lane County area.  The company's first performance at the Hult Center was Danse Renaissance in June 2003. On October 30, 2010, Ballet Fantastique opened its highly visible City Center for Dance at 960 Oak Street, funded largely by a grant from the Meyer Memorial Trust.

Company repertoire 

Selected list of new works created and choreographed by Donna and Hannah Bontrager for Ballet Fantastique:

External links 

www.balletfantastique.org, Ballet Fantastique  Ballet Fantastique Official Website

References 

Dance schools in the United States
Fantastique, Ballet
Dance in Oregon
Culture of Eugene, Oregon
2000 establishments in Oregon
Performing groups established in 2000